Drosophila cardini is a species of fruit fly in the Drosophila cardini species group.

References

Further reading

 

cardini
Articles created by Qbugbot
Insects described in 1916